Opossum Run is a stream in the U.S. state of Ohio.

Opossum Run received its name from an incident when road workers killed an opossum there.

See also
List of rivers of Ohio

References

Rivers of Champaign County, Ohio
Rivers of Guernsey County, Ohio
Rivers of Noble County, Ohio
Rivers of Ohio